The 2011 Hectorville siege took place between the hours of 2:30 a.m. and 10:30 a.m. on Friday, 29 April 2011, at the small suburb of Hectorville, east of Adelaide in the state of South Australia, Australia. It began after a 39-year-old resident of the suburb, later identified as Donato Anthony Corbo, entered his neighbours' property and shot four people, killing three and severely wounding one. An eight-hour stand-off with police followed, during which time he shot and wounded two officers. The stand-off culminated in his arrest by members of the Special Tasks and Rescue unit of South Australia Police.

Events
The incident started at approximately 2:30 a.m. when Corbo entered his neighbours' property and shot dead the 64-year-old man, then his 65-year-old wife and their 41-year-old son-in-law. A female who was also in the house at the time rang police and fled with her 14-year-old son and his 11-year-old friend, but the son was seriously wounded when Corbo shot him as he tried to flee the house.

A South Australia Police patrol were the first officers on the scene. It is alleged that when the officers approached the house, Corbo opened fire with a shotgun. One officer was seriously wounded when he was shot in the face and another officer was wounded in the knee, but was able to return fire and drag himself and his wounded colleague to safety. Both officers were taken to Royal Adelaide Hospital for treatment and survived. Corbo then fled next door back to his property, where he engaged in a tense siege with heavily armed members of the STAR force. After an eight-hour-long siege, police finally entered the property and arrested Corbo without further casualties.

Victims
The victims were South African immigrants who arrived in Australia three years before the shooting from Pretoria in the hope of a better life for their son as they felt that South Africa was a violent place to bring a child up. The two deceased victims were on holiday visiting the family and were due to return home to South Africa two days after the shooting took place. The family were deeply religious, members of the local Seventh-day Adventist Church.

Suspect
The suspect arrested was announced as being 39-year-old Donato Anthony Corbo, and had had previous dealings with the police. It is suggested that the reason for the killings may have sparked from an earlier row between the two families over Corbo's pet dog, a Staffordshire Terrier, which had recently been poisoned. It is also speculated that Corbo was suffering from mental health issues, stemming from a relationship breakup in December 2010. It is alleged that the weapon used during the shootings was a shotgun, a Class-A category firearm. It is not known if Corbo has a legitimate licence for the weapon. However, police would later remove three additional firearms from his property.

Aftermath

Corbo was later charged with three counts of murder, two counts of attempted murder, and a string of other offences, and if convicted, he would face an automatic penalty of three consecutive sentences of life imprisonment. He was refused bail and scheduled to appear in court on 2 May.

A day after the shootings occurred, the police officer who was seriously wounded after being shot in the face was confirmed to be in a serious but stable condition, under an induced coma at the Royal Adelaide Hospital. The 14-year-old boy who also suffered gunshot wounds was also stated to be in a similar condition.

Corbo appeared in Adelaide Magistrates Court on 2 May, charged with three counts of murder and two counts of attempted murder. He pleaded not guilty to the charges. He was scheduled to reappear in court on 26 July.

On 17 May 2012, Justice Michael David found Corbo not guilty due to mental incompetence of the murders of Luc Mombers, 41, and his parents-in-law Kobus, 64, and Annetjie Snyman, 65; the attempted murders of Mr Mombers' 14-year-old son Marcel and a police officer; and threatening a second police officer with a firearm. Corbo was automatically sentenced to three consecutive sentences of detention in hospital for life.

References

See also
 Timeline of major crimes in Australia
 Crime in Australia
 Crime in South Australia

2010s in Adelaide
Murder in Adelaide
History of Australia (1945–present)
Hostage taking in Australia
2011 murders in Australia